Bad Boys II: The Soundtrack is the soundtrack to Michael Bay's 2003 action-comedy film Bad Boys II. It was released on July 15, 2003 through Bad Boy Records. The album peaked at number one on the Billboard 200, selling 324,000 units in the first week, becoming one of few soundtracks to reach the position. On August 21, 2003, the Recording Industry Association of America certified the album platinum with over one million units shipped.

The second single, Jay-Z's "La-La-La", is the sequel of "Excuse Me Miss" from his album The Blueprint 2: The Gift & The Curse. The third single, "Shake Ya Tailfeather", by Nelly, P. Diddy and Murphy Lee, reached number one on the Billboard Hot 100 and it won Grammy Award for Best Rap Performance by a Duo or Group at the 46th Annual Grammy Awards.

Background 
The soundtrack became the first album to be released under the Bad Boy Records and Universal Records partnership. As the album's executive producer, P. Diddy stated:

P. Diddy shared his views on the album, saying "it's not just one of those soundtracks where it's just a compilation record and it's not cohesive... These are all new songs. I've done a lot of work [and] I've produced almost everybody that's on the soundtrack, or I've paired on a record with them before. I'm in constant contact with them. I think that everyone respected the fact that I wanted to do something that was special".

Reception 

The album received generally positive reviews from music critics. Rob Theakston of AllMusic noted that it is rare for a hip hop movie soundtrack to "be explosive and feel as if it's a solid cohesive album, rather than a showcase for various artists to use throwaway tracks". Rolling Stone concurred, saying "this is how to do a hip-hop soundtrack". Blender magazine observed that the record is "riddled with stars", "packed with production pyrotechnics", and called the album "pure Hollywood".

Track listing

Charts

Weekly charts

Year-end charts

Certifications

Credits 
Information taken from AllMusic:

 Producers: Sean Combs, Jayson "Koko" Bridges, Cool & Dre, DJ Whoo Kid, Tony Dofat, Just Blaze, Lenny Kravitz, Ryan Leslie, M.O.P., The Natural a.k.a. D-Nat, Nelly, The Neptunes, Red Spyda, Younglord, Joe Hooker
 Executive producers: Jerry Bruckheimer, Sean Combs, Kathy Nelson
 Engineers: Wayne Allison, Robert "Big Brizz" Bane, Andrew Coleman, Stephen Dent, Emery Dobyns, Tony Dofat, Shon Don, Jason "Jay E" Epperson, Chip Karpells, Gimel Keaton, Tony Maserati, Lynn Montrose, Red Spyda, Rocklogic, Sha Money XL, Frank Socorro, Carlisle Young
 Assistant engineers: Alexis Seton
 Assistants: Lynn Montrose, Alexis Seton
 Mixing: Diddy, Ken Duro Ifill, Gimel Keaton, Rich Keller, Paul Logus, Mike Patterson, Rob Paustian, Red Spyda
 Mastering: Chris Athens
 A&R: Conrad Diamanche, Damon Eden, Henry Joseph Pierre, Slam
 Programming: Tony Dofat, Mario Winans, Bill Danze (drums and keyboard),
 Creative director: Christopher Stern
 Bass: Eddie Monteiya
 Guitar: David Cabrera
 Vocals: Henry Joseph Pierre (vocal producer), LaToiya Williams, Pharrell Williams
 Music supervisor: Bob Badami, Kathy Nelson
 Soundtrack supervisor: Francesca Spero
 Production coordination: Gwendolyn Niles

References

External links

2003 soundtrack albums
Hip hop soundtracks
Bad Boys (franchise)
Action film soundtracks
Comedy film soundtracks
Bad Boy Records soundtracks
Albums produced by Cool & Dre
Albums produced by Just Blaze
Albums produced by Sean Combs
Albums produced by Ryan Leslie
Albums produced by the Neptunes
Albums produced by Lenny Kravitz